Dobersberg Airport is a private use airport located  west-northwest of Dobersberg, Lower Austria, Austria.

See also
List of airports in Austria

References

External links 
 Airport record for Dobersberg Airport at Landings.com
 

Airports in Lower Austria